Peter Eli Gordon (born 1966) is a historian of philosophy, a critical theorist, and intellectual historian. The Amabel B. James Professor of History at Harvard University, Gordon focuses on continental philosophy and modern German and French thought, with particular emphasis on the German philosophers Theodor Adorno and Martin Heidegger, critical theory, continental philosophy during the interwar crisis, and most recently, secularization and social thought in the 20th century.

Early life 
Born in Seattle, Washington, in 1966, Peter Gordon was the son of Sunnie and Milton Gordon. Milton Gordon (1930-2005) was a biochemist who attended University of Minnesota and the University of Illinois, earning his Doctor of Philosophy (PhD) degree at 23 and joining the faculty at the University of Washington in 1959, focusing on plant genetics. Peter Gordon received his Bachelor of Arts degree from Reed College (1988) after a stint at the University of Chicago. He studied with Martin Jay at University of California, Berkeley, from which he received his PhD degree (1997).

Career 
Gordon spent two years (1998–2000) at the Society of Fellows in the Liberal Arts at Princeton University before joining the faculty at Harvard in 2000. In 2006 he became a member of Harvard's permanent faculty, and in 2005 he received the Phi Beta Kappa Award for Excellence in Teaching.

Gordon's first book, Rosenzweig and Heidegger: Between Judaism and German Philosophy (University of California Press, 2003), about Martin Heidegger and the German-Jewish philosopher Franz Rosenzweig, won the Salo W. Baron Prize from the Academy for Jewish Research for Best First Book, the Goldstein-Goren Prize for Best Book in Jewish Philosophy, and the Morris D. Forkosch Prize from the Journal of the History of Ideas for Best Book in Intellectual History.

In Continental Divide: Heidegger, Cassirer, Davos (Harvard University Press, 2010), Gordon reconstructs the famous 1929 debate between Heidegger and Ernst Cassirer at Davos, Switzerland, demonstrating its significance as a point of rupture in Continental thought that implicated all the major philosophical movements of the day. Continental Divide was awarded the Jacques Barzun Prize from the American Philosophical Society in 2010.

Gordon's more recent monograph, Adorno and Existence (Harvard University Press, 2016), reinterprets Theodor W. Adorno's philosophy by looking at the critical theorist's encounters with existentialism and phenomenology. The main claim of the book is that Adorno was inspired by the unfulfilled promise of these schools to combat traditional metaphysical thinking, which led to the development of his "negative dialectics".

Gordon sits on the editorial boards of Constellations, Modern Intellectual History, The Journal of the History of Ideas, and New German Critique. He is co-founder and co-chair of the Harvard Colloquium for Intellectual History. Gordon regularly teaches two survey courses on continental philosophy: German Social Thought and French Social Thought, and also regularly teaches an intensive lecture course on Hegel and Marx.

Bibliography
 Rosenzweig and Heidegger, Between Judaism and German Philosophy (University of California Press, 2003)
 "Continental Divide: Heidegger and Cassirer at Davos, 1929—An Allegory of Intellectual History," Modern Intellectual History.  Vol. I, N. 2, (August, 2004), pp. 1–30.
 “Science, Realism, and the Unworlding of the World” in The Blackwell Companion to Phenomenology and Existentialism,  Mark Wrathall and Hubert Dreyfus, Eds. (Blackwell, 2006)
 “The Concept of the Unpolitical: German Jewish Thought and Weimar Political Theology” Social Research.  Special Issue on Hannah Arendt's Centenary Volume 74, Number 3 (Fall 2007)
 The Cambridge Companion to Modern Jewish Philosophy (co-editor with Michael Morgan, Cambridge University Press, 2007)
 “Neo-Kantianism and the Politics of Enlightenment” Philosophical Forum (Spring, 2008)
 “Hammer without a Master: French Phenomenology and the Origins of Deconstruction (or, How Derrida read Heidegger)” in Histories of Postmodernism, Mark Bevir, et al., eds. (Routledge, 2007)
 “The Place of the Sacred in the Absence of God: Charles Taylor’s A Secular Age” Journal of the History of Ideas Volume 69, Number 4 (October, 2008), pp. 647–673.
 “The Artwork Beyond Itself: Adorno, Beethoven, and Late Style” in The Modernist Imagination: Essays in Intellectual History and Critical Theory in Honor of Martin Jay (co-editor with Warren Breckman, et al., Berghahn Books, 2008)
 Gordon's review in Notre Dame Philosophical Reviews on Emmanuel Faye's Heidegger: The Introduction of Nazism into Philosophy in 1933. Michael B. Smith, trans.  (New Haven: Yale University Press, 2009)
 "Helter Skelter, German Style" in The New Republic on Hans Kundnani's Utopia or Auschwitz: Germany's 1968 Generation and the Holocaust (Columbia University Press, 2009)
 "Up from Zerio Hour" in The New Republic on Matthew Spector's Habermas: An Intellectual Biography (Cambridge University Press, 2010)
 Continental Divide: Heidegger, Cassirer, Davos (Harvard University Press, 2010)
 "The Guilty" in The New Republic on Deborah Lipstadt's The Eichmann Trial (New York: Schocken (Nextbook), 2011)
 “What Hope Remains?” in The New Republic, December 14, 2011. On Jürgen Habermas, An Awareness of What is Missing: Faith and Reason in a Post-Secularist Age and Judith Butler, Jürgen Habermas, et al., The Power of Religion in the Public Sphere.
 Weimar Thought: A Critical History (co-editor with John McCormick, Princeton University Press, 2013)
 Adorno and Existence (Harvard University Press, 2016)
 Authoritarianism  (co-authored with Wendy Brown and Max Pensky, University of Chicago Press, 2018)

References

External links
 Peter Gordon's Faculty Page
 Peter Gordon's bio at Harvard's Center for European Studies
 The Harvard Colloquium for Intellectual History
 Gordon's brief introduction to intellectual history, "What is Intellectual History?"

1966 births
20th-century American historians
20th-century American male writers
21st-century American historians
21st-century American male writers
American historians of philosophy
American male essayists
American male non-fiction writers
Harvard University faculty
Heidegger scholars
Intellectual historians
Living people
Reed College alumni
UC Berkeley College of Letters and Science alumni